SunCruz Casinos was one of many cruise lines that offered "cruises to nowhere," legally transporting passengers into international waters beyond the reach of federal and state gambling laws.

Four ships operated out of four ports including Jacksonville (SunCruz VII), Key Largo (SunCruz I), Myrtle Beach (SunCruz VIII), and Port Canaveral (SunCruz XII).

On December 16, 2009, SunCruz Casinos was reported to be closing amid reports of owing $300,000 to the Canaveral Port Authority.  Parent company Ocean Casino Cruises filed Chapter 7 bankruptcy December 28.

At the time of the filing of bankruptcy, there were about 300 full-time and part-time employees.

History
In 1994 Gus Boulis, already a multi-millionaire by founding the Miami Subs sandwich shop franchise, bought a number of luxury yachts. He remodeled the yachts as casinos, and began to operate his "cruises to nowhere," sailing three miles from the Florida coast into what was then considered international waters. There, out on the sea, passengers would gamble on poker, blackjack and slot machines. Boulis called his fleet of 11 ships the SunCruz Casino line. By the time he sold the company in 2000, SunCruz Casinos was earning tens of millions of dollars in annual profits, and employed over 2,000 people.

In September 2007, SunCruz discontinued operation at Palm Beach. Service was subsequently discontinued at Daytona and Treasure Island.

Investigation

In the 2000s, lobbyists such as Jack Abramoff became involved illegally with the sale of the line. Boulis was murdered in 2001.

See also
 SunCruz Aquasino
 List of defunct gambling companies

Footnotes

Defunct cruise lines
Gambling companies established in 1994
Gambling companies disestablished in 2009
Defunct gambling companies
Companies that have filed for Chapter 7 bankruptcy
1994 establishments in Florida